Germany was represented by the Les Humphries Singers, with the song "Sing Sang Song", at the 1976 Eurovision Song Contest, which took place on 3 April in The Hague. "Sing Sang Song" originally placed runner-up in the German national final but became the German entry when the winner, "Der Star" by Tony Marshall, was disqualified.

Before Eurovision

Ein Lied für Den Haag
The final was held over two nights – 31 January and 1 February – at the TV studios in Frankfurt, hosted by Max Schauzer. 12 songs took part with six performed on each evening, with the winner chosen by postcard voting, the results of which were announced on 18 February. "Der Star" was the public choice by a margin of over 20,000 votes, but was later disqualified when it was discovered that the song had been performed in public prior to the national final. "Sing Sang Song" was therefore promoted and announced as the 1976 German entry.

Other participants with Eurovision connections were Ireen Sheer (Germany 1978, Luxembourg 1974 and 1985), Lena Valaitis (Germany 1981) and Piera Martell (Switzerland 1974).

At Eurovision 
On the night of the final the Les Humphries Singers performed 3rd in the running order, following Switzerland and preceding Israel. In comparison to the slickly presented, precisely choreographed stage routines put together by other acts in the early part of the show (such as the United Kingdom's Brotherhood of Man and Chocolate, Menta, Mastik from Israel), the German presentation came across on screen as ragged and untidy in the extreme, with no apparent thought having been given to providing a focused ensemble performance, and the audience response at the end of the song was noticeably muted and unenthusiastic. At the close of voting "Sing Sang Song" had received 12 points, placing Germany 15th of the 18 entries. The German jury awarded its 12 points to France.

"Sing Sang Song" has a very negative reputation, with both song and performance often being mentioned as among the worst ever heard and seen in a Eurovision final. An open online poll of Eurovision fans rated the song as the worst of the 1970s. The Les Humphries Singers had enjoyed considerable success prior to the contest but disbanded shortly thereafter: the Eurovision disaster is thought to have been a major factor in this decision.

Voting

References 

1976
Countries in the Eurovision Song Contest 1976
Eurovision